The 1914–1918 Inter-Allied Victory medal was a French commemorative medal established on 20 July 1922. It was the French version of a common allied campaign medal where each allied nation issued a Victory Medal to their own nationals, all issues having certain common features, including the same ribbon, a winged figure of victory on the obverse and a similar inscription on the reverse, the French version reading "LA GRANDE GVERRE POUR LA CIVILISATION 1914-1918".

It was awarded to all soldiers who served three months, consecutive or not, between 2 August 1914 and 11 November 1918 in the war zone. It was also awarded to civilian nurses, aliens (civilian or military) who served directly under French command, marshals and generals who had a command for at least three months, prisoners of war from Alsace and Lorraine who then served in the French forces. Article 10 of the establishing law states: "The right to the medal is also granted to soldiers who were killed by the enemy or died from wounds of war and those (....) who died of disease or injury incurred in service." The next of kin of those killed or died were required to procure the medal at their own expense.

International award
In response to a  proposal first made by the French Marshal Ferdinand Foch, supreme commander of the Allied Forces during the First World War, most allied nations issued a Victory Medal following a common design, thereby avoiding any need for countries to exchange campaign medals. Each country produced their own version, following certain common criteria. The medal was to be in bronze with a 36 mm diameter, having a winged figure of victory on the obverse, a common inscription on the reverse and suspension by a double rainbow design ribbon. Japan and Siam replaced the figure of victory, since a winged victory symbol was not culturally relevant.

The following versions were finally awarded: At the start of the war in 1914, the countries of Poland and Czechoslovakia were parts of the Russian and Austro-Hungarian Empires respectively.

Award certificate 
A certificate confirming the award was given to each recipient confirming his right to wear the medal.

See also

 Allied Victory Medal
 French medals for the First World War
 Orient campaign medal: WWI French campaign medal for the Macedonian front
 Marne Medal: WWI French campaign medal for the First and Second Battles of the Marne
 Dardanelles campaign medal: WWI French campaign medal for the Gallipoli campaign

References

French campaign medals
France
Awards established in 1922
France in World War I